During the First World War the British Armed Forces was enlarged to many times its peacetime strength.  This was done mainly by adding new battalions to existing regiments (the King's Royal Rifles raised a total of 26 battalions). Although sometimes identified by shoulder titles, generally the new battalions could not be identified from appearance. Consequently, the units in this list have been assembled considering only those as having a uniquely different cap badge.

Royal Navy
Although men of the Royal Navy served on land in many areas throughout the world, the units listed below served as an infantry division in Gallipoli, Belgium and France (the 63rd (Royal Naval) Division).

 1st (Drake) Battalion
 2nd (Hawke) Battalion
 3rd (Benbow) Battalion
 4th (Collingwood) Battalion
 5th (Nelson) Battalion
 6th (Howe) Battalion
 7th (Hood) Battalion
 8th (Anson) Battalion
 9th (Chatham) Battalion RMLI
 10th (Portsmouth) Battalion RMLI
 11th (Plymouth) Battalion RMLI
 12th (Deal) Battalion RMLI
 9th (Machine Gun) Battalion
 Royal Marine Artillery
 Royal Marine Labour Corps
 Royal Naval Air Service Armoured Car Section
 Royal Naval Air Service

Cavalry

Regular
The cavalry consisted of Guards (Household Cavalry), Dragoon Guards, Dragoons, Hussars and Lancers.  The volunteer cavalry was the Yeomanry.

 1st Life Guards
 2nd Life Guards
 Royal Horse Guards
 1st (King's) Dragoon Guards
 2nd Dragoon Guards (Queen's Bays)
 3rd (Prince of Wales's) Dragoon Guards
 4th (Royal Irish) Dragoon Guards
 5th (Princess Charlotte of Wales's) Dragoon Guards
 6th Dragoon Guards (Carabiniers)
 7th (Princess Royal's) Dragoon Guards
 1st (Royal) Dragoons
 2nd Dragoons (Royal Scots Greys)
 3rd (King's Own) Hussars
 4th (Queen's Own) Hussars
 5th (Royal Irish) Lancers
 6th (Inniskilling) Dragoons
 7th (Queen's Own) Hussars
 8th (King's Royal Irish) Hussars
 9th (Queen's Royal) Lancers
 10th (Prince of Wales's Own Royal) Hussars
 11th (Prince Albert's Own) Hussars
 12th (Prince of Wales's Royal) Lancers
 13th Hussars
 14th (King's) Hussars
 15th (The King's) Hussars
 16th (The Queen's) Lancers
 17th (Duke of Cambridge's Own) Lancers
 18th (Queen Mary's Own) Royal Hussars
 19th (Queen Alexandra's Own Royal) Hussars
 20th Hussars
 21st (Empress of India's) Lancers

Special Reserve
 North Irish Horse
 South Irish Horse
 King Edward's Horse (The King's Own Overseas Dominion Regiment)

Yeomanry

 Royal Wiltshire Yeomanry (Prince of Wales's Own Royal Regiment)
 Warwickshire Yeomanry
 Yorkshire Hussars (Alexandra, Princess of Wales's Own)
 Nottinghamshire Yeomanry (Sherwood Rangers)
 Staffordshire Yeomanry (Queen's Own Royal Regiment)
 Shropshire Yeomanry
 Ayrshire (Earl of Carrick's Own) Yeomanry
 Cheshire Yeomanry (Earl of Chester's)
 Queen's Own Yorkshire Dragoons
 Leicestershire Yeomanry (Prince Albert's Own)
 North Somerset Yeomanry
 Duke of Lancaster's Own Yeomanry
 Lanarkshire Yeomanry
 Northumberland Hussars
 Nottinghamshire Yeomanry (South Nottinghamshire Hussars)
 Denbighshire Hussars
 Westmorland and Cumberland Yeomanry
 Pembroke Yeomanry (Castlemartin)
 Royal East Kent Yeomanry (The Duke of Connaught's Own)
 Hampshire Yeomanry
 Royal Buckinghamshire Hussars
 Derbyshire Yeomanry
 Queen's Own Dorset Yeomanry
 Royal Gloucestershire Hussars
 Hertfordshire Yeomanry
 Berkshire Yeomanry
 1st County of London Yeomanry (Middlesex, Duke of Cambridge's Hussars)
 Royal 1st Devon Yeomanry
 Suffolk Yeomanry (The Duke of York's Own Loyal Suffolk Hussars)
 Royal North Devon Yeomanry
 Queen's Own Worcestershire Hussars
 Queen's Own West Kent Yeomanry
 West Somerset Yeomanry
 Queen's Own Oxfordshire Hussars
 Montgomeryshire Yeomanry
 Lothians and Border Horse
 Lanarkshire Yeomanry (Queen's Own Royal Glasgow and Lower Ward of Lanarkshire)
 Lancashire Hussars Yeomanry
 Surrey Yeomanry (Queen Mary's Regiment)
 Fife and Forfar Yeomanry
 Norfolk Yeomanry (The King's Own Royal Regiment)
 Sussex Yeomanry
 Glamorganshire Yeomanry
 Welsh Horse Yeomanry – formed in 1914
 Lincolnshire Yeomanry
 City of London Yeomanry (Rough Riders)
 2nd County of London Yeomanry (Westminster Dragoons)
 3rd County of London Yeomanry (Sharpshooters)
 Bedfordshire Yeomanry
 Essex Yeomanry
 Northamptonshire Yeomanry
 East Riding of Yorkshire Yeomanry
 Lovat Scouts
 Scottish Horse – two regiments with a third formed in 1914

War-formed
Household Cavalry Composite Regiment
 Reserve Cavalry Regiments

Support Arms
Royal Regiment of Artillery consisting of three branches:
Royal Horse Artillery
Royal Field Artillery
Royal Garrison Artillery
Corps of Royal Engineers including 
Royal Engineers Signal Service

Infantry

Guards
 Grenadier Guards
 Coldstream Guards
 Scots Guards
 Irish Guards
 Welsh Guards – formed in 1915
 Guards Machine Gun Regiment
 Household Battalion

Regular infantry
Most regiments had two regular battalions, supported by associated battalions from the Territorial Force ('part-time' soldiers) and Reserve Battalions.  After the start of the war, many new battalions were raised and called "Service Battalions".  Service battalions raised from a single locale were often called "Pals battalions".

 Royal Scots (Lothian Regiment)
 Queen's (Royal West Surrey Regiment)
 Buffs (East Kent Regiment)
 King's Own (Royal Lancaster Regiment)
 Northumberland Fusiliers
 Royal Warwickshire Regiment
 Royal Fusiliers (City of London Regiment)
 King's (Liverpool Regiment)
 Norfolk Regiment
 Lincolnshire Regiment
 Devonshire Regiment
 Suffolk Regiment
 Prince Albert's (Somerset Light Infantry)
 Prince of Wales's Own (West Yorkshire Regiment)
 East Yorkshire Regiment
 Bedfordshire Regiment
 Leicestershire Regiment
 Royal Irish Regiment
 Alexandra, Princess of Wales's Own (Yorkshire Regiment)
 Lancashire Fusiliers
 Royal Scots Fusiliers
 Cheshire Regiment
 Royal Welsh Fusiliers
 South Wales Borderers
 King's Own Scottish Borderers
 Cameronians (Scottish Rifles)
 Royal Inniskilling Fusiliers
 Gloucestershire Regiment
 Worcestershire Regiment
 East Lancashire Regiment
 East Surrey Regiment
 Duke of Cornwall's Light Infantry
 Duke of Wellington's (West Riding Regiment)
 Border Regiment
 Royal Sussex Regiment
 Hampshire Regiment
 South Staffordshire Regiment
 Dorsetshire Regiment
 Prince of Wales's Volunteers (South Lancashire Regiment)
 Welsh Regiment
 Black Watch (Royal Highlanders)
 Oxfordshire and Buckinghamshire Light Infantry
 Essex Regiment
 Sherwood Foresters (Nottinghamshire and Derbyshire Regiment)
 Loyal North Lancashire Regiment
 Northamptonshire Regiment
 Princess Charlotte of Wales's (Royal Berkshire Regiment)
 Queen's Own (Royal West Kent Regiment)
 King's Own (Yorkshire Light Infantry)
 King's (Shropshire Light Infantry)
 Duke of Cambridge's Own (Middlesex Regiment)
 King's Royal Rifle Corps
 Duke of Edinburgh's (Wiltshire Regiment)
 Manchester Regiment
 Prince of Wales's (North Staffordshire Regiment)
 York and Lancaster Regiment
 Durham Light Infantry
 Highland Light Infantry
 Seaforth Highlanders (Ross-shire Buffs, The Duke of Albany's)
 Gordon Highlanders
 Queen's Own Cameron Highlanders
 Royal Irish Rifles
 Princess Victoria's (Royal Irish Fusiliers)
 Connaught Rangers
 Princess Louise's (Argyll and Sutherland Highlanders)
 Prince of Wales's Leinster Regiment (Royal Canadians)
 Royal Munster Fusiliers
 Royal Dublin Fusiliers
 Rifle Brigade (Prince Consort's Own)

Territorial Force
Infantry regiments of just Territorial Force battalions (i.e. no regular or Special Reserve battalions).

 Honourable Artillery Company, T.F.
 Monmouthshire Regiment, T.F.
 Cambridgeshire Regiment, T.F.
 London Regiment, T.F.
 Inns of Court, T.F.
 Hertfordshire Regiment, T.F.
 Herefordshire Regiment, T.F.
 Northern Cyclist Battalion, T.F.
 Highland Cyclist Battalion, T.F.
 Kent Cyclist Battalion, T.F.
 Huntingdonshire Cyclist Battalion, T.F.

Others
 Royal Militia of the Island of Jersey
 Royal Guernsey Light Infantry

Services

 Machine Gun Corps
 Motor Machine Gun Service
 Labour Corps
 Army Service Corps
 Royal Army Medical Corps
 Army Veterinary Corps
 Tank Corps
 Army Ordnance Corps
 Army Cyclist Corps
 Royal Flying Corps  (not separate at this time, but controlled by the War Office)
 Army Remount Service
 Army Dental Corps
 Royal Army Pay Corps
 Army Chaplain Department

See also
 British Army order of precedence
 List of pals battalions

References

Bibliography

Lists of military units and formations of World War I
Military units and formations of the United Kingdom in World War I
Lists of military units and formations of the United Kingdom